John Dombrowski Roberts (June 8, 1918 – October 29, 2016) was an American chemist. He made contributions to the integration of physical chemistry, spectroscopy, and organic chemistry for the understanding of chemical reaction rates.  Another characteristic of Roberts' work was the early use of NMR, focusing on the concept of spin coupling.

Career

Roberts received both a B.A. (1941) and Ph.D. (1944) from the University of California, Los Angeles, working under Professor William Gould Young. He held several positions at the California Institute of Technology, including Division Chairman of Chemistry and Chemical Engineering from 1963 to 1968, Dean of the Faculty and Provost from 1980 to 1983 and Institute Professor of Chemistry, Emeritus (1988-2016) in the Division of Chemistry and Chemical Engineering. He is credited with bringing the first female graduate student, Dorothy Semenow, to Caltech when he moved from MIT. He was a consultant for DuPont Central Research (1950-2008) and for Oak Ridge.

He published his autobiography in 1990, The Right Place at the Right Time. Roberts died on October 29, 2016 at the age of 98 from a stroke.

Awards and honors
Roberts was elected a Member of the American Academy of Arts and Sciences in 1952. He was elected Member of the National Academy of Sciences in 1956 at 38 years old. He was elected to the American Philosophical Society in 1974. In 1978, he was elected a Fellow of The Explorers Club. In 1984, Roberts received the Golden Plate Award of the American Academy of Achievement, awarded the Priestley Medal in 1987, the National Medal of Science in 1990, the Glenn T. Seaborg Medal in 1991, the NAS Award in Chemical Sciences in 1999, the Nakanishi Prize in 2001, the NAS Award for Chemistry in Service to Society in 2009, the Linus Pauling Legacy Award in 2006 and the American Institute of Chemists Gold Medal in 2013.

Roberts received honorary degrees from the University of Munich (1962), Temple University (1964) and the University of Notre Dame.

In 1998 he was named by Chemical & Engineering News as one of the 75 most influential chemists of the last 75 years.

References

Sources
Roberts, John D. "ABCs of FT-NMR." University Science Books, Sausalito, California, 2000.
"JDR." Engineering & Science 1980, 44(2), p. 10.

Books
  (Alternate link to official Caltech repository for book)
 
 
 
  (Alternate link to official Caltech repository for book)

External links
 
 
Caltech faculty page
Biography in E&S
A Video interview of Professor Roberts

1918 births
2016 deaths
Writers from Los Angeles
American chemists
National Medal of Science laureates
University of California, Los Angeles alumni
Harvard University faculty
Massachusetts Institute of Technology faculty
California Institute of Technology faculty
University of Notre Dame people
Fellows of the American Academy of Arts and Sciences
Members of the United States National Academy of Sciences
Members of the American Philosophical Society